P96 may refer to:

 , a submarine of the Royal Navy
 Jersey Shore Airport, in Nippenose Township, Pennsylvania, United States
 P-96 pistol
 Papyrus 96, a biblical manuscript
 Picasso 96, a graphics adapter API for the Amiga computer
 Tecnam P96 Golf, an Italian light aircraft
 P96, a state regional road in Latvia